Toxikk is an Arena FPS video game by Hanover, Germany-based software developer Reakktor. The game is built on the Unreal Engine 3 and is currently in beta. The beta was released for Windows via Steam Early Access on 22 January 2015.

References

External links 
Official website

First-person shooters
Unreal Engine games
Windows games
Windows-only games
Multiplayer online games
Video games with user-generated gameplay content
2016 video games
Video games developed in Germany
Video games with Steam Workshop support
Reakktor Studios games